The Association "Live" is the first live album by The Association.  The 2-disc album set was recorded at a concert in Salt Lake City and released by Warner Bros. Records in 1970.  This album peaked at number 79 on the Billboard 200 album chart.

Track listing

Personnel
 Jules Gary Alexander - lead guitar, vocals
 Larry Ramos - lead guitar, vocals
 Jim Yester - rhythm guitar, organ, vocals
 Russ Giguere - congas, timbales, shakers, tambourine, rhythm guitar, vocals
 Terry Kirkman - tenor and soprano recorders, trumpet, flugelhorn, piano, organ, saxophone on "Babe I'm Gonna Leave You", harmonica on "Blistered", tambourine, vocals
 Brian Cole - bass, vocals
 Ted Bluechel, Jr. - drums, cowbell, vocals

Charts

The Association albums
1970 live albums
Warner Records live albums